Eric Van Lancker (born 30 April 1961 in Oudenaarde) is a Belgian former road bicycle racer. After retiring, he worked as a team manager for several different professional teams.

Major results

1983
 2nd Flèche Ardennaise
 8th Ronde van Vlaanderen Beloften
1984
 3rd Paris–Brussels
 7th Overall Tour de l'Avenir
 8th GP Stad Zottegem
1985
 1st  Overall Milk Race
1st Stages 1 & 9
 1st Stage 1 Danmark Rundt
 6th Rund um den Henninger Turm
 9th La Flèche Wallonne
 9th Druivenkoers Overijse
1986
 1st Stage 22 Giro d'Italia
 1st Stage 9 Tour de Suisse
 1st Stages 4a & 4b Paris–Nice
 4th Overall Tour of Belgium
 6th Grand Prix de Wallonie
 8th Brabantse Pijl
 9th Overall Tour Méditerranéen
1987
 2nd Giro di Lombardia
 2nd Gran Piemonte
 2nd Overall Tour Méditerranéen
 3rd GP de Fourmies
 8th Overall GP Tell
1st Stage 5
 8th Milano–Torino
1988
 1st Stage 2 Vuelta a Cantabria
 2nd Overall Tour of Belgium
1st Stage 1
 6th Overall Volta a Catalunya
 9th Overall Tour de Suisse
1989
 1st Amstel Gold Race
 4th Grand Prix de la Libération (TTT)
 7th Overall Tour of the Basque Country
1st Stage 3
 8th Dwars door België
1990
 1st Liège–Bastogne–Liège
 1st Stage 2 Tour de France (TTT)
 2nd Overall Escalada a Montjuïc
1st Stage 1a
 4th Grand Prix de Lunel
1991
 1st Grand Prix des Amériques
 1st Wincanton Classic
 5th Road race, National Road Championships
 5th Overall Tour of Ireland
 5th Liège–Bastogne–Liège
 9th La Flèche Wallonne
1992
 1st Stages 1 & 5 Tour du Vaucluse
 5th GP Stad Zottegem
 9th Japan Cup Cycle Road Race
1993
 5th Overall Tour DuPont
1994
 1st Bruxelles-Ingooigem
1995
 2nd La Côte Picarde

Grand Tour general classification results timeline

External links
Palmarès by velopalmares.free.fr/ 

1961 births
Belgian male cyclists
Living people
Belgian Giro d'Italia stage winners
People from Oudenaarde
Tour de Suisse stage winners
Cyclists from East Flanders